Mohamed Karim Sassi (born 12 December 1968) is a Tunisian triple jumper.

He represented the club AC Nabeul. He won the silver medals at the 1990 Maghreb Championships and the 1995 All-Africa Games, and competed at the 1995 World Championships and the 1996 Olympic Games without reaching the final. He became Tunisian champion in 1988, 1989, 1991, 1993, 1995 and 1996.

His personal best jump was 16.76 metres, achieved in August 1995 in Limoges.

Achievements

References

External links

1968 births
Living people
Tunisian triple jumpers
Athletes (track and field) at the 1996 Summer Olympics
Olympic athletes of Tunisia
Male triple jumpers
Tunisian male athletes
African Games silver medalists for Tunisia
African Games medalists in athletics (track and field)
Athletes (track and field) at the 1995 All-Africa Games